João Carlos (John Charles in Portuguese) may refer to:

João Carlos, Prince of Beira (1821–1822), Portuguese prince
João Carlos (football manager) (born 1956), João Carlos da Silva Costa, Brazilian football manager
João Carlos (footballer, born 1972), João Carlos dos Santos, Brazilian football defender
João Carlos (footballer, born 1982), João Carlos Pinto Chaves, Brazilian football centre-back
João Carlos (footballer, born 1992), João Carlos dos Santos Torres, Brazilian football right-back
João Carlos (footballer, born 1987), João Carlos de Castro Ferreira, Brazilian football forward
João Carlos (footballer, born 1988), João Carlos Heidemann, Brazilian football goalkeeper
João Carlos (footballer, born 1989), João Miguel Martins Pais De Carlos, Portuguese football winger
João Carlos (footballer, born 1995), João Carlos Cardoso Santo, Brazilian football forward